Disneytown is a shopping, dining, and entertainment complex at the Shanghai Disney Resort in Pudong, Shanghai, China. It is the Shanghai Disney Resort equivalent of the Downtown Disney complex at the Disneyland Resort in Anaheim, California; Disney Springs at the Walt Disney World Resort near Orlando, Florida; Ikspiari at Tokyo Disney Resort, and Disney Village at Disneyland Paris, France.

Disneytown is located near the two hotel resorts and Shanghai Disneyland Park. Along with dining and shops, the complex features the Walt Disney Grand Theatre, an Art Deco theatre that hosts the Mandarin Broadway version of The Lion King.

There are numerous restaurants to choose from, from Blue Frog, to Coconut Paradise. The award-winning Crystal Jade offers a Chinese menu, and there is even a trendy bar by the name of Kokio Gastrobar where parents can relax after a long day in the park. 

At the heart of Disneytown is the Marketplace – with specialty shops with Disney merchandise, musicians and entertainers. Next to the Marketplace is an area called Spice Alley, offering a variety of Asian cuisine. Also near Disneytown is the resort's central lake area. The area includes a walking path and various gardens.

Tenants

 Shanghai Min 
 Crystal Jade
 The Cheesecake Factory 
 A Bathing Ape 
 Lego Store 
 Starbucks 
 Food Republic 
 Element Fresh
 Coconut Paradise 
 The Dining Room 
 Hatsune 
 blue frog 
 Xin Wang Restaurant 
 BreadTalk
 Toast Box
 Chow Tai Fook 
 Spoonful of Sugar
 World of Disney

See also
 Downtown Disney (Disneyland Resort)
 Disney Springs (Walt Disney World Resort)
 Ikspiari (Tokyo Disney Resort)
 Disney Village (Disneyland Paris)

References

External links

Shanghai Disney Resort
Walt Disney Parks and Resorts attractions
Tourist attractions in Shanghai
Economy of Shanghai
Amusement parks in Shanghai
Buildings and structures in Shanghai
Pudong
2016 establishments in China